WFCA may refer to:

 WFCA (FM), a radio station (107.9 FM) licensed to serve French Camp, Mississippi, United States
 WFCA Plc, an advertising agency group
 Welsh Federation of Coarse Anglers, the national governing body for coarse fishing in Wales
 Wisconsin Football Coaches Association, an association of football coaches for all levels in the state of Wisconsin